Jorge Alberto Daponte (5 June 1923 – 9 March 1963) was a racing driver from Argentina.

Daponte was born in Buenos Aires. He participated in two World Championship Formula One Grands Prix, appearing for the first time on 17 January 1954, and scoring no championship points. He also participated in several non-Championship races. He died at 39 years of age, possibly of suicide.

Complete Formula One World Championship results
(key)

References

1923 births
1963 deaths
Racing drivers from Buenos Aires
Argentine racing drivers
Argentine Formula One drivers
World Sportscar Championship drivers

Carrera Panamericana drivers
Suicides in Argentina